The Villa Blanche is a historic townhouse in Les Sables-d'Olonne, Vendée, France. It was built in 1913, and designed by architect Maurice Durand. It was a tearoom until 1914, when it was used by an estate agent named Fraud. It became a private residence in 1925.

References

Houses completed in 1913
Buildings and structures in Vendée
20th-century architecture in France